The Carpenter House located on Kentucky Highway 148 one mile south of Clark Station, Shelby County, Kentucky, was constructed during 1843 – 1848, and added to the National Register of Historic Places in 1988.  Built in antebellum vernacular style, it incorporates stone, weatherboard, metal, and brick materials into its construction.

It is a two-story, center-passage, single-pile plan house.

References

National Register of Historic Places in Shelby County, Kentucky
Houses in Shelby County, Kentucky
Houses on the National Register of Historic Places in Kentucky
Houses completed in 1848
1848 establishments in Kentucky
Antebellum architecture
Central-passage houses